WISE 0855−0714 (full designation WISE J085510.83−071442.5, or W0855 for short) is a sub-brown dwarf  from Earth, therefore the fourth-closest star or (sub-) brown dwarf system to the Sun, the discovery of which was announced in April 2014 by Kevin Luhman using data from the Wide-field Infrared Survey Explorer (WISE). , WISE 0855−0714 has the third-highest proper motion after Barnard's Star and Kapteyn's Star and the fourth-largest parallax of any known star or brown dwarf. It is also the coldest object of its type found in interstellar space, having a temperature in the range .

Characterization

Observations

The WISE object was detected in March 2013, and follow-up observations were taken by the Spitzer Space Telescope and the Gemini North telescope. The name WISE J085510.83−071442.5 includes the coordinates and indicates the object was in Hydra in 2000. The latter covers a further 44' west so with this star moving through one arcminute every 7.38 years, it will in about the year 2,324 move into Canis Minor for the next few centuries.

Distance and proper motion
Based on direct observations, WISE 0855−0714 has a large parallax, which specifically relates to its distance from the Solar System. WISE 0855−0714's proper motion across the sky is also directly observed over time, causing it to stand out in the observations, but the proper motion is itself a combination of its speed in the galactic neighborhood relative to the Solar System as well as its proximity to the Solar System. If it were moving exactly as fast but farther away, if it were moving more slowly but closer, or if it were moving more quickly near to the Sun but moving at a high angle towards or away from the Sun, it would have a smaller proper motion.

Spectrometry
Infrared images taken with the Magellan Baade Telescope suggest evidence of water clouds.

Model-derived understanding
This mass is in the range of a sub-brown dwarf or other planetary-mass object.

As of 2003, the International Astronomical Union considers an object with a mass above , capable of fusing deuterium, to be a brown dwarf. A lighter object and one orbiting another object is considered a planet. However, if the distinction is based on how the object formed then it might be considered a failed star, a theory advanced for the object Cha 110913-773444.

See also

 CFBDSIR 2149-0403, the first free-floating object with a confirmed mass below .
 List of nearest stars and brown dwarfs
 Luhman 16
 PSO J318.5-22
Superjupiter
Sub-brown dwarf

References

Further reading
 (Note: WISE 0855−0714 is not mentioned in this paper; it is about other Y-type objects discovered by WISE.)

External links
WISE J0855-0714 at Solstation.com

201303??
Hydra (constellation)
Local Bubble
WISE objects
Y-type stars
Brown dwarfs
Rogue planets